Angela Denise Trimbur (born July 19, 1981) is an American actress, writer, dancer, choreographer, and former reality television participant.

Personal life
Trimbur was born in Bucks County, Pennsylvania, on July 19, 1981. She attended Neshaminy High School  and graduated in 1999. Prior to attending high school, She was homeschooled. She grew up a Jehovah's Witness, though she has stated she no longer practices the religion. Trimbur is a member of the Los Angeles-based basketball team Pistol Shrimps, alongside actress Aubrey Plaza. In 2014 she created the L.A. City Municipal Dance Squad, a team of dancers to perform a halftime show for the Los Angeles Women's Community Basketball pickup league, which quickly grew a large following. Angela began offering workshops and created events called "Slightly Guided Dance Party" hosted by the Museum of Contemporary Art with 300+ in attendance. Trimbur was featured in Time magazine in 2018, for building a unique community for women.

In July 2018, Trimbur was diagnosed with breast cancer. After undergoing treatment, Trimbur began hosting breast cancer support groups on Marco Polo to help others.

Career
Before acting, Trimbur was a contestant on the thirteenth season of MTV's Road Rules: X-Treme. She was a replacement for Kina Dean, and went on to help her team win the Final Reward. It was revealed in the "Stunt School" challenge that Trimbur wanted to be an actress. She also participated in the Real World/Road Rules Challenge: Battle of the Sexes 2.

Trimbur began her acting career training in scene study at Sanford Meisner's Playhouse West, and improv at the Upright Citizens Brigade Theatre in Los Angeles. She has guest starred in episodes of The Good Place, Drunk History, Workaholics, Californication, Anger Management, Hand of God, and CSI: Cyber. Her appearance on Reno 911 was featured in the opening credits for Season 6.

Trimbur starred as Harley David in the 2009 slasher horror Halloween II. The following year, she portrayed the supporting role of Sassy in the 2010 comedy film Freak Dance. Also in 2010, Trimbur debuted an autobiographical show at the Los Angeles Upright Citizens Brigade Theater on her childhood titled Trapped: Life As A Homeschooled Jehovah's Witness. She then co-starred in the 2011 drama film The Future and the 2013 comedy-drama The Kings of Summer. In 2012, she played Cleopatra in the YouTube series Epic Rap Battles of History.

In 2015, Trimbur gained praise for her supporting role as Tina in the horror comedy The Final Girls. On April 28, 2015, Comedy Central bought an untitled comedy series created by Trimbur, Amanda Lund, and Maria Blasucci, which focuses on a misfit, all-female basketball team in Los Angeles. , Trimbur and Blasucci have appeared in the 2016 documentary film The Pistol Shrimps, about the actual recreational basketball team of the same name, but no further news regarding the possible Comedy Central series is available.

Filmography

Film

Television

References

External links
 

1981 births
Living people
21st-century American actresses
American film actresses
American television actresses
People from Bucks County, Pennsylvania
Actresses from Pennsylvania
Road Rules cast members
The Challenge (TV series) contestants